Marie-Josephte Corriveau (1733 at Saint-Vallier, Quebec –  at Quebec City), better known as "la Corriveau", is a well-known figure in Québécois folklore. She lived in New France, and was sentenced to death by a British court martial for the murder of her second husband, was hanged for it and her body hanged in chains. Her story has become a legend in Quebec, and she is the subject of many books and plays.

Early life 

Marie-Josephte Corriveau was born in 1733, most probably in January or February, and baptised on May 14, 1733, in the rural parish of Saint-Vallier in New France. She was the only surviving offspring of Joseph Corriveau, a farmer, and Marie-Françoise Bolduc. Her ten brothers and sisters all died in childhood.

Marriages and deaths of spouses
Corriveau married at the age of 16, on November 17, 1749, to Charles Bouchard, aged 23, also a farmer. Three children were born in this marriage: two daughters, Marie-Françoise (1752) and Marie-Angélique (1754), followed by a son, Charles (1757). Rumors (that only started after the death of her second husband) say that she murdered him, as there is no concrete record of his death. Charles Bouchard was buried on April 27, 1760, and she remarried fifteen months later, on July 20, 1761, to another farmer from Saint-Vallier, Louis Étienne Dodier. On the morning of January 27, 1763, he was found dead in his barn, with multiple head wounds. Despite an official recording of the cause of death being from kicks of horses' hooves, and a speedy burial, rumours and gossip of murder spread rapidly through the neighbourhood. Dodier was on bad terms with his father-in-law and with his wife.

Arrest and trial
At the time, New France had been conquered by the British in 1760 as part of the Seven Years' War and was under the administration of the British Army. On hearing the rumours, the local British military authorities (charged with keeping order) set up an inquiry into Dodier's death. The inquiry opened in Quebec City on March 29, 1763, at the Ursulines of Quebec, charging Joseph Corriveau and his daughter Marie-Josephte, before a military tribunal made up of 12 English officers and presided over by Lieutenant Colonel Roger Morris. Many persons in the community had testified, including Joseph's niece and Marie-Josephte's cousin, a young woman approximately the same age as Marie-Josephte named Isabelle Sylvain. The case ended, on 9 April, with Joseph Corriveau being sentenced to death, for culpable homicide of his son-in-law. Marie-Josephte was found to be an accomplice to murder, and sentenced to 60 lashes and branded with the letter M on her hand. One of Joseph Corriveau's nieces, Isabelle Sylvain (who he employed as a servant), had testified but changed her story several times during the hearing; she was found guilty of perjury and given 30 lashes and branded with the letter P.

Condemned to hang, Joseph Corriveau then told his confessor, that he was no more than an accomplice to his daughter, after she had killed Dodier. At a second trial, on 15 April, Marie-Josephte testified to having killed her husband with two blows of a hatchet during his sleep, because of his ill-treatment of her. The tribunal found her guilty and sentenced her to hang, her body after to be "hanged in chains" (that is, put up for public display on a gibbet).

Execution
The place of execution was Quebec, on the Buttes-à-Nepveu, near the Plains of Abraham, probably on 18 April. Her body was then taken, as directed by the sentence, to be put in chains at Pointe-Lévy, at the crossroads of Lauzon and Bienville   ( Rue Saint-Joseph and Rue de l'Entente). The body, in its iron gibbet, was exposed to the public view until May 25 at the earliest. Following the requests of those living nearby, an order from the military commander of the district of Quebec, James Murray, addressed to the captain of the militia of Pointe-Lévy, permitted its being taken down and buried.

In 1851, the "cage" was dug up from the cemetery of the church of Saint-Joseph-de-la-Pointe-Lévy when a pit was dug. Soon after, the cage was stolen from the church cellar, and acquired by the American impresario P. T. Barnum and put on display as a "macabre object". After that, it was put on display at The Boston Museum. The museum slip indicated its provenance with two words: "From Quebec".

Through the efforts of the Société d'histoire de Lévis, the cage was acquired from the Boston Museum and is now part of a permanent display at Musée de la civilisation in Quebec City.

In legend 

The post-mortem exhibition of Corriveau's remains at a busy crossroads (a practice also in use under the French regime, and reserved in England for those found guilty of the most serious crimes); the repercussions in the trial; the rumour that her father would be convicted of murdering Dodier at his daughter's instigation; and the gossip which grew up around the circumstances of the death of her first husband all stirred up the popular imagination and became legends still told today in the oral tradition — increasing the number of murdered husbands to as many as seven and likening la Corriveau to a witch.

The 1851 discovery of the iron cage buried in the cemetery of Saint-Joseph Parish (now the Lauzon district) served to reawaken the legends and the fantastic stories, which were amplified and used by 19th-century writers. The first, in 1863, Philippe Aubert de Gaspé in Les Anciens Canadiens, has a supernatural Corriveau hanging in the Pointe-Levy cage, terrorising one night a passer-by conducting a witches' Sabbath and Will-o'-the-wisp at the Île d'Orléans. James MacPherson Le Moine (Maple Leaves, 1863) and William Kirby, following in his footsteps (The Golden Dog, 1877), made her a professional poisoner, a direct descendant of La Voisin, famous for her purported role in the Affair of the Poisons. Writers and historians such as Louis Fréchette and Pierre-Georges Roy have tried to give Corriveau's history, but without completely separating the facts from the anachronistic fantasies added in legend and novels.

The figure of Corriveau still inspires novels, songs and plays and is the subject of arguments concerning guilt. Oral tradition also perpetuated and has not stopped, and remains alive, as is evidenced by the numerous stories collected in the lands of many regions of Quebec.

In popular culture 

 1863: Les Anciens Canadiens (The Canadians of Old), novel by Philippe Aubert de Gaspé
 1863: Marie-Josephte Corriveau, A Canadian Lafarge, in Maple Leaves by James MacPherson Le Moine
 1966: La Corriveau, dramatic ballet choreographed by Brydon Paige, with original theme and songs by Gilles Vigneault and music by Alexander Brott.
 1972: La Corriveau, song written by Gilles Vigneault in 1966 for the ballet of the same name, is recorded by Pauline Julien on her album 
 1973: Ma Corriveau, play by Victor-Lévy Beaulieu written for the public examinations of the students of the National Theatre School of Canada, premièred at the Monument-National, its Montreal base, from 3 to 6 October 1973 with a production by Michelle Rossignol, first premièred professionally at the Théâtre d'Aujourd'hui in Montreal from 19 September to 30 October 1976 in a production by André Pagé.
 1981: La Corriveau, historical novel by Andrée LeBel
 1990: La Cage, play by Anne Hébert, translated into English in 2009.
 1993: La Corriveau, short story by the English Canadian Douglas Glover, translated into French the same year, and into Serbian in 1995.
It was reprised, adapted for television with the title La Corrivaux by the director Jean Salvy, with Anne Dorval in the title role, and broadcast on the Télévision Radio-Canada network in 1995.
 1999: La Maudite, teen novel by Daniel Mativat
 2001: La Corrida de la Corriveau, song by Mes Aïeux (on the album )
 2003: La Fiancée du vent: l'histoire de la Corriveau, née en Nouvelle-France et pendue sous le Régime anglais, novel by Monique Pariseau
 2003: Julie et le serment de la Corriveau, teen novel by 
2003: Her story and the alleged paranormal aspects of it were featured in Episode 1 of Season 2 of the Canadian paranormal documentary series Creepy Canada, which carried out and showed a reenactment of her story and its allegedly paranormal aspects.
 2004: Battle of the Brave (Nouvelle-France), film produced by Jean Beaudin (loose adaptation on the theme of la Corriveau)
 2006: La Corriveau, animated film by Kyle Craig
 2015: Corriveau is featured on a postage stamp from Canada Post
2022: Les Filles du QUOI?, play by Abby Paige

Sources 
 
 
 
 . Brief article published in the online version of The Canadian Encyclopedia
 
 
  Anthology containing fifteen oral versions of the legend of la Corriveau, different literary texts inspired by the theme, and four studies.
 
 
 
  Reprinted in 
 
 
  Encyclopaedia article

Notes

References

Further reading 
 

External links 

Latest access date of external links: 17 April 2010
Archive documents
 Documents concernant la Corriveau, Bibliothèque et Archives nationales du Québec, Centre d'archives de Québec, Collection Centre d'archives de Québec, P1000,S3,D435. 128-page collection of research notes on la Corriveau (p. 1), typed transcription of the article by James MacPherson Le Moine, Marie-Josephte Corriveau, A Canadian Lafarge, from 1863 (pp. 2–11), a newspaper clipping entitled Le procès de la Corriveau, dated 28 February 1939 (p. 12) and a copy of the proceedings of the Corriveau case (typist's copy and photostat of the manuscript) (pp. 13–128) of the originals preserved by the Imperial War Museum in London.

Oral tradition
 Angélina Roy, La Corriveau, 1953. Story about the legend of la Corriveau, recounted 15 November 1953 by Madame Wilfrid Fradette, née Angélina Roy (1875–1958), of Saint-Raphaël de Bellechasse, to Luc Lacourcière. Archives de Folklore de l'Université Laval, Collection Luc Lacourcière, enreg. 1658, published in 
 Gema Leblanc, La Corriveau, 1989. Story about the legend of la Corriveau, recounted in 1989 by Gema Leblanc, inhabitant of Quebec, to Isabelle-Sophie Dufour. Published in Nicole Guilbault (ed.), Contes et sortilèges des quatre coins du Québec, Documentor/Cégep François-Xavier-Garneau, Quebec, 1991.
 José Bourassa, La Corriveau, 1989. Story about the legend of la Corriveau, recoiunted in 1989 by José Bourassa, inhabitant of Charny, Quebec, born in Drummondville, to Dany Parizé. Published in Nicole Guilbault (ed.), Contes et sortilèges des quatre coins du Québec, Documentor/Cégep François-Xavier-Garneau, Quebec, 1991.

Song
 Mes Aïeux, La Corrida de la Corriveau (lyrics)
 Gilles Vigneault, La Corriveau (lyrics)

Sculpture
 La Corriveau, bronze sculpture by Alfred Laliberté made between 1928 and 1932, now in the Musée national des beaux-arts du Québec

Popular culture
 Nineteenth-century tobacco rolling machine, in the figure of la Corriveau in the cage
 Corriveau is featured on a postage stamp from Canada Post in 2015

Animated film
 La Corriveau, animated film by Kyle Craig – original version (23 min.) and abridged version (12 min.)

Commercial use
 La Corriveau, dark oatmeal ale from the Quebec microbrewery Le Bilboquet

People of New France
People executed by military occupation forces
Executed Canadian people
1733 births
1763 deaths
Executed Canadian women
Executed French people
People executed by the British military by hanging
People executed for murder
French people convicted of murder
Canadian people convicted of murder
People from Chaudière-Appalaches
Canadian female murderers
Canadian legends
Canadian folklore
Canadian ghosts
French Quebecers
Mariticides